The Yakima Valley Warriors were a professional indoor football team that will played in the American Indoor Football Association in the 2010 season.  The Warriors were based in Yakima, Washington.  Their home games were played at the Yakima SunDome.

The Warriors were Yakima's first indoor football team since the National Indoor Football League's Yakima Shockwave, which played in only the NIFL's inaugural 2001 season before folding.

In August 2011, Mike Mink put the team up for sale.  After being unable to secure new ownership, the Warriors team officially ceased operations in 2013.

Season-By-Season

|-
|2010 || 7 || 7 || 0 || 4th Western || --

References

External links 
 Y.V. Warriors' Official Site
 Warriors' 2010 Stats

American football teams in Washington (state)
American Indoor Football Association teams
Yakima, Washington
American football teams established in 2009
American football teams disestablished in 2013
2009 establishments in Washington (state)
2013 disestablishments in Washington (state)